Vicenza Volley was an Italian women's volleyball club based in Vicenza. It played in the Serie A1 from 1998 until 2009.

Previous names
Due to sponsorship, the club have competed under the following names:
 Battistolli-Lattebusche Vicenza (1992–1993)
 Volley Vicenza (1993–1994)
 Barausse Vicenza (1994–1995)
 Biasia Volley Vicenza (1995–1996)
 Biasia Oyster Vicenza (1996–1997)
 Biasia Vicenza (1997–1998)
 Cosme Ceis Vicenza (1998–2000)
 Minetti Vicenza (2000–2001)
 Metodo Minetti Vicenza (2001–2002)
 Metodo Infoplus Vicenza (2002–2003)
 Minetti Infoplus Vicenza (2003–2007)
 Minetti Infoplus Imola (2007–2008)
 Minetti Vicenza (2008–2009)
 Osmo BPVi Vicenza (2009–2010)

History 
It was established 1992 through the merger of two smaller local clubs, Vicenza 3 and Araceli. In the same year, it acquired the rights to participate in the Serie A2 championship from Volley Noventa, a Noventa Vicentina-based volleyball club. Vicenza Volley was promoted to Serie A1 in 1998.

After winning a European CEV Cup and an Italian Super Cup in 2001, the club was relegated to Serie A2 in 2008. Vicenza Volley went bankrupt and on 26 June 2010 ceased all its activities.

Honours

National competitions
  Italian Super Cup: 1
2001

International competitions
  CEV Cup: 1
2000–01

References

External links
Official website
Club profile at CEV
 

Italian women's volleyball clubs
Volleyball clubs established in 1992
1992 establishments in Italy
Defunct sports teams in Italy
Sports clubs disestablished in 2010
2010 disestablishments in Italy
Sport in Vicenza
Serie A1 (women's volleyball) clubs